The Aukštaitijos narrow gauge railway (Lithuanian Aukštaitijos siaurasis geležinkelis for highlands narrow gauge railway) is a  long tourist train from Panevėžys to Rubikiai in Lithuania with a gauge of .

History 
The first section was completed on 11 November 1895 from Švenčionėliai to Pastovai and extended in 1898 up to Panevėžys. Regular passenger and goods traffic commenced in autumn 1899. Initially, there were 2 depots, 14 stations, 15 locomotives, 58 passenger carriages of various types, 6 postal carriages as well as 112 covered and 154 open goods waggons. In 1903 approximately 65,000 tons of goods and 40,632 passengers were transported. Panevėžys became a regional centre during Lithuania's independence (1920-1938), and thus a lot of raw materials such as coal, oil, sand, salt and fertilizer were transported as well as agricultural produce such as flax, bacon, sugar, grain, flour and timber.

The railway was most successful between World War I and World War II and supported the economic development of the region. The railway was operated by the governmental Lithuanian railway Lietuvos Geležinkeliai after World War II.

Traffic declined in the second half of the 20th century. The operations ceased in 1996 north of Panevezys. The narrow gauge railway was added to the list of immovable cultural objects of the Republic of Lithuania in 1996 and was given the status of cultural heritage object. Subsequently, tourist train services began. The goods traffic was phased-out in 1999. A new department for Narrow Gauge Railways was created on 1 November 1999 within the governmental railways office Lietuvos Geležinkeliai. Even so, the passenger traffic ceased temporarily in 2001. With effect from 2006 tourist trains were run with ТУ2 diesel locomotives and these were well received with increasing passenger numbers.

Cultural heritage 
The railway stations along the narrow gauge railway track are important historic and cultural structures and are important regarding the urban and architectural development of the region. Thus the railway was added to the list of immovable cultural objects of the Republic of Lithuania and was given the status of cultural heritage object.

Furthermore, the government decided in 2003 to protect some of the railway's structures as cultural monuments according to Article 10.2 of the Law for the Protection of Immovable Cultural Objects:

 The narrow gauge railway line from Panevėžys to Rubikiai
 The depot, the stores and the viaduct in Panevėžys
 The railway stations in Taruškos and Raguvėlė, the stores, water tower, workshop, the station building and the water crane in Raguvėlė railway station
 Surdegis railway station
 Troškūnai railway station the station building and a house nearby
 Anykščiai railway station, the station building, the stores, the water tower, the water crane
 Anykščiai railway bridge

Photos along the track

References 

Narrow gauge railways in Lithuania
Objects listed in Lithuanian Registry of Cultural Property